A total of 103 executions have been recorded in New Mexico: four during the Spanish Colonial era (1598–1821), none during the Mexican era (1821–1846), 51 during the Territorial era (1846–1913), 20 by the U.S. Military during the Taos Rebellion (1847), 27 between 1913 and 1960, when the death penalty was removed except for the murder of a police officer, and one since 1976, when the death penalty was reinstated; it remained until March 18, 2009, when Governor Bill Richardson signed a bill abolishing capital punishment into law after many struggles with the issues in previous weeks.  Following this repeal, Bernalillo County Sheriff Darren White began a campaign to repeal the repeal by referendum.

Ninety-four of the executions were by hanging, seven by electrocution, one by the lethal gas, and one by lethal injection. Two of the hanged, "Black Jack" Ketchum in 1901 and Lucius Hightower in 1916, were accidentally decapitated by the noose due to their weight. The death sentences of five convicts were commuted by Governor Toney Anaya in 1986, on the eve of Thanksgiving. 

The following is a list of the 28 executions carried out by the state of New Mexico since 1912.

See also
 Capital punishment in New Mexico
 Capital punishment in the United States

External links 
Capital Punishment or Compassion - Executions in the State of New Mexico: The Death Penalty Since Territorial Days (2003)

 
New Mexico
People executed